Cryptkeeper or Crypt Keeper may refer to:

 The Crypt-Keeper, a narrator from the comic Tales from the Crypt
 Euderus set, the crypt-keeper wasp
 Crypt Keeper (wrestler), ring name of José Estrada Jr., a Puerto Rican professional wrestler

See also
 The Cryptkeeper Five, an American band